Caitríona O'Leary (born 17 November 1969) is an Irish singer known for her performances of Irish traditional music and Early music. Described by Crescendo Magazine as "a fascinating, charismatic singer" and by Toccata-Alte Musik aktuell as a musician that "captivates and captures the listener immediately".

Discography
 Dido and Aeneas (1994, Vox Classics)
 Saints - Sequentia (1996, BMG/Deutsche Harmonia Mundi)
 Shining Light - Sequentia (1996, BMG/Deutsche Harmonia Mundi)
 Aquitania - Sequentia (1997, BMG/Deutsche Harmonia Mundi)
 Carolan’s Harp - The Harp Consort (1997, BMG/Deutsche Harmonia Mundi)
 Ludus Danielis - The Harp Consort (1998, BMG/Deutsche Harmonia Mundi)
 La Púrpura de la Rosa - The Harp Consort (1999, BMG/Deutsche Harmonia Mundi)
 Dúil, Irish Songs of Love and Nature - O’Leary and Dúlra (2000 EMI/Virgin Classics)
 I am Stretched on your Grave - O’Leary and Dúlra (2001, BMG/Deutsche Harmonia Mundi)
 Miracles of Notre Dame - The Harp Consort (2003, BMG/Deutsche Harmonia Mundi)
 Magdalena, Medieval Songs for Mary Magdalen - Joglaresa (2004, Avie)
 Ecstasy - O’Leary and Dúlra (2012, Heresy Records/Naxos)
 Shipwrecked - eX Early Music Ensemble (2012, Heresy Records/Naxos)
 Motion of the Heart & Viva Frida - The Dublin Drag Orchestra (2012, Heresy Records/Naxos)
 Possessed - eX Early Music Ensemble (2013, Heresy Records/Naxos)
 Sleepsongs - O’Leary and Dúlra (2014, Heresy Records/Naxos)
 The Wexford Carols with Tom Jones and others (2014)
 Strange Wonders, the Wexford Carols, Vol.2 (2021, Heresy Records)

References

External links
 
 Dúlra on Heresy Records
 O'Leary on Ludström Arts Management's website
 O'Leary on the Beethovenfest Bonn's website

1969 births
Living people
Irish-language singers
Irish women singers
Irish folk singers
Irish mezzo-sopranos
Musicians from County Donegal
Sony BMG artists
EMI Records artists
Irish women composers